Dorudgu (also Romanized as Dorūdgū; also known as Doroogh Goo’iyeh, Dorūdgū’īyeh, Dorūghgū, and Dorūghgū’īyeh) is a village in Maskun Rural District, Jebalbarez District, Jiroft County, Kerman Province, Iran. At the 2006 census, its population was 98, in 24 families.

References 

Populated places in Jiroft County